The 2007 Grand Prix de Denain was the 49th edition of the Grand Prix de Denain cycle race and was held on 19 April 2007. The race was won by Sébastien Chavanel.

General classification

References

2007
2007 in road cycling
2007 in French sport
April 2007 sports events in France